Acraea simulator is a butterfly in the family Nymphalidae. It is found in Cameroon. For taxonomy see Pierre & Bernaud, 2014

References

Butterflies described in 1995
simulator
Endemic fauna of Cameroon
Butterflies of Africa